Events in the year 2008 in Burkina Faso.

Incumbents 

 President: Blaise Compaoré
 Prime Minister: Tertius Zongo

Events

February 
February 1 – Minister of health announces the country is at major risk for a Meningitis outbreak due to lack of preparation.
February 22 – Riots break out in Bobo-Dioulasso and Ouhigouya due to increasing prices of basic necessities and unstable economic conditions.

July 
July 16 – President Compaoré meets with American President George W Bush at the White House.

November 
 November 15 – More than 60 people are killed near the town of Boromo after a truck collided with an overloaded bus.

Deaths

References 

 
2000s in Burkina Faso
Years of the 21st century in Burkina Faso
Burkina Faso
Burkina Faso